"One for Peedi Crakk" is the debut single by American rapper Peedi Crakk, released in 2002. It features American rappers Freeway, Young Chris and Beanie Sigel, and was produced by Megahertz. The song is from the soundtrack to the 2002 film Paid in Full.

Background
American rapper Cam'ron originally recorded a verse on the song. It was removed by Jay-Z, much to Peedi Crakk's disappointment. However, a remix of the song featuring Juelz Santana, Cam'ron and Beanie Sigel was later released. 

The song became Peedi Crakk's first single to chart on the Billboard R&B/Hip-Hop top 40.

Critical reception
Complex placed the song at number 50 on its "The 50 Best Philadelphia Rap Songs" list in 2012. Julian Kimble of Complex wrote, "he showed off that choppy flow and charisma that should've made him rich."

Charts

References

2002 songs
2002 debut singles
Peedi Crakk songs
Freeway (rapper) songs
Beanie Sigel songs
Roc-A-Fella Records singles
Songs written by Beanie Sigel
Songs written by Young Chris